30th Street may refer to:

 30th Street (San Diego), California
 30th Street (Manhattan)
 30th Street Station, Philadelphia
 30th Street station (disambiguation), stations with the name 30th Street